Pitch Black Progress is the second studio album by Swedish metal band Scar Symmetry. The album was released in Europe on April 21, 2006 and in North America on May 2, 2006 through Nuclear Blast.

Pitch Black Progress was recorded, mixed, and mastered at Black Lounge Studios, Avesta, Sweden, on various occasions during 2005, by Jonas Kjellgren. The album's artwork and layout was created by Anthony Clarkson.  Allmusic praised the album's "uncompromisingly extreme hard-soft dynamics and accompanying, remarkably accessible sing-and-grunt-along choruses".

The track "The Illusionist" was promoted with two different music videos; the second version used as the official video by releasing label Nuclear Blast. The original version is available at the band's own YouTube site.

Track listing

Credits 
Scar Symmetry
 Christian Älvestam – vocals
 Jonas Kjellgren – guitar
 Per Nilsson – guitar
 Kenneth Seil – bass guitar
 Henrik Ohlsson – drums, lyrics

Release history

References

2006 albums
Scar Symmetry albums
Nuclear Blast albums